This is a timeline of Georgian history, comprising important legal and territorial changes and political events in Georgia and its predecessor states. To read about the background to these events, see History of Georgia. See also the List of Georgian Kings and Queens.

1800000 BC

8000 BC - 7000 BC

6200 BC - 4000 BC

4000 BC - 2200 BC

3400 BC - 2000 BC

2500 BC - 760 BC

1200 BC - 600 BC

1112 BC

760 BC

700 BC

600 BC

500 BC

302 BC

284 BC

90 BC

65 BC

1st century

2nd century

3rd century

4th century

5th century

6th century

7th century

8th century

9th century

10th century

11th century

12th century

13th century

14th century

15th century

16th century

17th century

18th century

19th century

20th century

21st century

See also
 Timeline of Tbilisi

Further reading

External links
 

Georgia
 Timeline
Georgia (country) history-related lists